Oberharz is a former Samtgemeinde ("collective municipality") in the district of Goslar, in Lower Saxony, Germany. It was situated in the western part of the Harz, approx. 15 km southwest of Goslar. Its seat was in the town Clausthal-Zellerfeld. It was disbanded in January 2015, when its member municipalities merged into the town Clausthal-Zellerfeld.

The Samtgemeinde Oberharz consisted of the following municipalities:

 Altenau
 Clausthal-Zellerfeld 
 Schulenberg im Oberharz
 Wildemann

References 

Former Samtgemeinden in Lower Saxony
Goslar (district)